Independence Airport may refer to:

 Independence Airport in Independence, California, United States (FAA: 2O7)
 Independence Airport (Belize) in Belize
 Independence Municipal Airport (Iowa) in Independence, Iowa, United States (FAA: KIIB)
 Independence Municipal Airport (Kansas) in Independence, Kansas, United States (FAA: KIDP)
 Independence State Airport in Independence, Oregon, United States (FAA: 7S5)

Other airports located in cities named Independence:
 Faust Field a private use airport in Independence, Oregon, United States (FAA ID: OR77)
 Wigrich Airport a private use airport in Independence, Oregon, United States (FAA ID: OR85)